"Catch the Sun" is the second single from Doves' debut studio album Lost Souls. The single was released on 29 May 2000 in the UK on 2 CDs and 10" vinyl, and charted at number 32 on the UK Singles Chart. The psychedelic, kaleidoscopic music video for "Catch the Sun" was directed by Sophie Muller. Jamie Cullum covered "Catch the Sun" on his album Catching Tales.

"Down to Sea" is an early demo of "Sea Song." The B-sides for CD2 are songs from Doves' previous incarnation as Sub Sub. The versions of "Crunch" and "Lost in Watts" differ slightly from those found on Sub Sub's album Delta Tapes. "Crunch" is an edit, and "Lost in Watts" is an alternate mix omitting some background vocals (which are prominent on the Delta Tapes version).

The B-side "Valley" features the piano riff from The Beach Boys' Smile-era songs "Do You Like Worms" and "Heroes And Villains".

The song was also featured in the soundtrack of the video game Project Gotham Racing.

Track listings

Charts

References

2000 singles
2000 songs
Doves (band) songs
Heavenly Recordings singles
Songs written by Jimi Goodwin
Songs written by Andy Williams (Doves)
Songs written by Jez Williams
Music videos directed by Sophie Muller